Kersik Tua is a village in Kerinci Regency, Jambi Province, on the island of Sumatra in Indonesia. Its chief distinction is its proximity to Kerinci Seblat National Park and Mount Kerinci, making it a popular place for hikers and other travelers to stay and buy provisions.

References

Kersik Tua